The Italy national U-16 football team is the national under-16 football team of Italy and is controlled by the Italian Football Federation. The team was known as Italy national under-15 football team prior 2001, to reflect the age limit at the start of season instead of currently end of season.

The Italy under-16 football team is a feeder team of the Italy under-17 team.

The under-16 team was known as the under-15 team prior to 2001; before 2001, the UEFA European Under-17 Championship was known as UEFA European Under-16 Football Championship (the under-19 Championship was similarly known as the under-18 tournament) due to the name referring to the age limit at the start of a new season. Since the 2002 Tournament, the age in the name of the tournament has referred to the age limit at the end of season. The current manager is Daniel Zoratto,. They play the majority of their home matches at the Stadio Comunale "Filippo Pirani" in Grottammare, Marche.

History
The team regularly competes in the Montaigu Tournament, winning on two occasions (1999, 2003), finishing runner-up on four occasions (1982, 2000, 2004, 2006), and third place on a further two occasions (1994, 1995).

Current squad

References

European national under-16 association football teams
Under-16
Youth football in Italy